The Wheeling Heritage Trails are two trails in Wheeling, West Virginia.

Location

Ohio River Trail
 Southern terminus at 48th St. and Water St. in South Wheeling.
 Northern terminus at the Pike Island Lock and Dam and connection with the Brooke Pioneer Trail in Clearview.

Wheeling Creek Trail
 Western terminus 14th St. at Heritage Port Park in downtown Wheeling.
 Eastern terminus at the intersection of Community St. and Angle Av. in Elm Grove.

References

External links
 Official link

Rail trails in West Virginia
Geography of Wheeling, West Virginia
Protected areas of Ohio County, West Virginia
Transportation in Ohio County, West Virginia
Heritage trails